The Canadian province of Prince Edward Island has three counties that have historically been used as administrative divisions for the provincial government, and prior to Confederation (in 1873), the colonial government.

The current system of land division in Prince Edward Island, including its three counties, dates to a series of surveys undertaken in 1764-65 by Captain Samuel Holland of the British Army's Corps of Royal Engineers. Holland's survey saw the island divided into the three counties, each of which had a "royalty" (or shire town) as a county seat.

The counties are no longer used as administrative boundaries for the provincial government; however, they continue to be used as census divisions by Statistics Canada for statistical purposes in administering the Canadian census.

See also

Administrative divisions of Canada

References

 
Counties
Prince Edward Island